Bobby Bryndale Massie (born August 1, 1989) is an American football offensive tackle who is currently a free agent. He played college football at Mississippi. He was drafted by the Arizona Cardinals in the fourth round of the 2012 NFL Draft. He has also played for the Chicago Bears.

College career
Massie played three seasons for Ole Miss becoming a full-time starter midway through his freshman year. He started all 12 games at right tackle in both 2010 and 2011—his sophomore and junior years. He wore number 79.

Massie announced on January 6, 2012, that he would forgo his senior year and enter the 2012 NFL Draft.

Professional career

Arizona Cardinals
Massie was considered one of the best fifteen offensive tackle prospects for the 2012 NFL Draft by NFLDraftScout.com. On April 28, 2012, Massie was selected by the Arizona Cardinals in the fourth round (112th pick overall) of the NFL Draft. On September 5, 2015, Massie was suspended for the first two games of the 2015 season for violating the NFL's Policy and Program on Substances of Abuse.

Chicago Bears
On March 9, 2016, Massie signed a three-year contract with the Chicago Bears worth $18 million.

On January 26, 2019, Massie signed a four-year contract extension with the Bears through the 2022 season.

In Week 2 of the 2020 season against the New York Giants, Massie recorded his first career catch, a four yard pass intended for tight end Jimmy Graham, during the 17–13 win. He was placed on injured reserve on November 3, 2020, with a knee injury. He was designated to return from injured reserve on December 30, and began practicing with the team again, but the team did not activate him before the end of the season.

On March 17, 2021, the Bears declined the option on Massie's contract, making him an unrestricted free agent.

Denver Broncos
On May 12, 2021, Massie signed a one-year contract with the Denver Broncos worth $4 million.

References

External links
 
 Ole Miss Rebels bio

1989 births
Living people
Sportspeople from Lynchburg, Virginia
Players of American football from Virginia
American football offensive tackles
Ole Miss Rebels football players
Arizona Cardinals players
Chicago Bears players
Denver Broncos players